Tzaneen is a large tropical garden town situated in the Mopani District Municipality of the Limpopo province in South Africa. It is situated in a high rainfall fertile region with tropical and subtropical agriculture taking place in a  region.  It is Limpopo's second largest town after Polokwane.

About 475,000 people reside within a  radius, with the town itself holding a population of around 30,000. Tzaneen is today a proud home of both the Tsonga and Bapedi. Approximately 225,000 Bapedi Tribes of Balobedu ba ga Modjadji, BaNareng ba ga sekororo, Batlou ba ga makgoba, Bathlabine ba ga mogoboya, BaKgaga ba maake, Bakgaga ba maupa and Babirwa ba ga Raphahlelo, phooko and Bakoni ba mametja call Tzaneen their home. Equally so, approximately 220,000 Tsonga  tribes of Shiluvane-Nkuna tribe Hosi Muhlaba-Shiluvane (132,000 people/subjects) and Valoyi tribe under Hosi Nwamitwa-Valoyi (91,000 people/subjects) make the same claim that Tzaneen is also their native land, thereby making the Tsonga-Bapedi ratio at Tzaneen a 50:50 outcome. The White population is around 25,000, which consists mainly the Afrikaner people and a very small minority of English, Portuguese, Scottish, Irish,  and German. The Afrikaner people constitute more than 90% of the white population in Tzaneen.

Origin of the name
Tzaneen's name is derived from a Sepedi word 'Tsaneng', which refers to a small basket called 'Tsana'. Tsana was made of bamboo grass called Lehlaka. Due to the fertile riverbank, the area was known to produce high-quality bamboo grass used to make different types of utensils. Tsana was a popular utensil made in the area. People came from different areas for the popular Tsana. Later the area would be known as DiTsaneng (a place where Tsanas are made). On the arrival of colonisers, the name changed to Tzaneen, which has since then been called.

Nonetheless, the name 'Tzaneen' adopted by the Afrikaner people, from the Tlou people under Makgoba, renamed the place back to 'Tsaneng', because today it is a place where Bapedi tribes and other people 'gather', thus fulfilling the name.

Geology and geography
Tzaneen is Limpopo's paradise and it has been nicknamed 'Land of Silver Mist' because of the frequent mist that occur on the mountains above it. The Iron Crown mountain, also known by its Afrikaans name Wolkberg, supports Limpopo's biodiversity and is home to South Africa's second largest indigenous forest after Tsitsikamma forest in the southern Cape. Weather can change very fast from clear skies to being misty, with the highest reaches enveloped in clouds. Hence the name of the range, meaning "Cloud Mountain" in Afrikaans. The Wolkberg is rugged, with rocky shoulders and deep humid gorges. There are rare plant and animal species in these areas. Species such as the Wolkberg Zulu (Alaena margaritacea), the Wolkberg widow (Dingana clara) and the Wolkberg sandman (Spialia secessus), have been named after these mountains. The Wolkberg area is one of only two areas in the world where the critically endangered butterfly, Lepidochrysops lotana, are found. The Iron Crown Mountain is a protected area in terms of South African law. The Groot Letaba River, Middle Letaba River and Klein Letaba River all rise up in these mountains.

Agriculture

Tzaneen produces about 40% of South Africa's avocados, 40% of South Africa's mangoes and 20% of South Africa's bananas. Tzaneen also produces 90% of South Africa's tomatoes through the ZZ2, and other, farms making South Africa the world's 40th largest tomato producer. Even though South Africa is ranked 40th in terms of tomato production, the ZZ2 farms themselves are the world's biggest producer of tomatoes. Tzaneen is also the biggest producer of pine plantations in the Limpopo Province, accounting for more than 85% of Limpopo's pine and bluegum production. The majority of Tzaneen's tropical indigenous forest have been destroyed during the last 100-years in order to give way to pine, bluegum and other agricultural plantations.

The economy of Tzaneen depends largely on farming fruits, vegetables, animals and timber. Agriculture was the key development in the rise of Tzaneen, whereby farming of domesticated species created food surpluses that nurtured its development. Water boreholes are common in Tzaneen farms and households as a means to water crops and for household chores.

A wide range of fruit are grown in the Tzaneen area, notably mangoes, bananas, oranges, tomatoes and avocados. Pine and eucalyptus plantations are also a common sight in the area around the town, particularly toward Modjadjiskloof, Magoebaskloof and Haenertsburg. The plantations serve a number of sawmills located in the area.

Education

Tzaneen branch is charged with the responsibility of effecting quality education and training for all. It was during this time that the branch had to shape up its direction and coordinate all professional developments and support. Policies, systems, and procedures had to be developed. This was not easily achievable due to a lack of personnel to effect change. Tzaneen still remains as one of the areas in South Africa with a high rate of tertiary graduates but a low employment rate.

Sports
Soccer and rugby are the main sports in Tzaneen. Soccer is widely played in rural areas and townships.
Mountain hiking became popular teams like Tzaneen Hiking Club, Mount Sibu hiking and Bokgaga hiking Club.

Tourism
Tourism is also an important part of the Tzaneen economy, along with agribusiness. Tzaneen offers great country and town accommodation for visitors.

There are many tourist attractions around the small town of Tzaneen, including the beautiful Tzaneen Dam, Magoebaskloof, Haenertsburg and Wolkberg mountains. The town is also situated close to a number of game reserves and the town often serves as a thoroughfare for tourists on their way to other tourist destinations in the province.

The Vervet Monkey Foundation is located just outside Tzaneen where it cares for over 600 vervet monkeys.

Weather
Mostly sunshine, long summer days with pleasant winters. Tzaneen's subtropical conditions provide more suited weather for dense forests (high summer rainfall) than the thorny bushveld above the escarpment and further to the east.

Notable people
Tito Mboweni (born 1959), businessman, economist and former central banker
Marchant de Lange (born 1990), international cricketer
Master KG, singer, record producer
King Monada, singer
Mahlatse "Chiliboy" Ralepelle (born 1986), rugby player
Trevor Nyakane, South African rugby union player
Judas Moseamedi, PSL player
Andrew Rabutla, former Jomo Cosmos F.C. player
Ernst Roets (born 1985), Deputy CEO of AfriForum
Peta Teanet, Music Producer and Singer
Given Mkhari, Media Mogul
Benny Mayengani, Singer
Ndavi Nokeri, Miss South Africa 2022
Fumani Shiluvana, Actor, producer
Jay-Jay Maake, MP, ANC activist

References

External links

 Tzaneen Business, Community & Tourism Site Tzaneen Business, Community & Information Gateway - www.tzaneeninfo.com
 Tzaneen Travel / Business Directory Comprehensive Tzaneen Travel Directory
 Tzaneen Country Club Tzaneen Golf Course
More about Tzaneen
Municipal Demarcation Board: Map of the Mopani District Municipality
Government website

Populated places in the Greater Tzaneen Local Municipality